J.E. Piland House, also known as Diamond Grove, is a historic home located near Margarettsville, Northampton County, North Carolina. It was built in 1910, and is a two-story, "L"-shaped, transitional Queen Anne / Colonial Revival style frame dwelling with a one-story rear wing.  It has a high hipped roof, one-story wraparound porch, and exterior-end brick chimney.  Also on the property is the contributing garage (c. 1910).  The house was under restoration in 2001.

It was listed on the National Register of Historic Places in 2004.

References

Houses on the National Register of Historic Places in North Carolina
Queen Anne architecture in North Carolina
Colonial Revival architecture in North Carolina
Houses completed in 1910
Houses in Northampton County, North Carolina
National Register of Historic Places in Northampton County, North Carolina